Harriton High School is a public secondary school in Rosemont, Pennsylvania serving portions of Lower Merion Township, Pennsylvania. The school is located on the Philadelphia Main Line.

Harriton is one of two high schools in the Lower Merion School District; the other is Lower Merion High School.

History
Harriton High School is  situated on a portion of the plantation grounds belonging to Charles Thomson, son-in-law of Richard and Hannah Harrison, giving Harriton High School its name. Thomson was secretary (1774–1789) of the Continental Congresses as well as convention to debate and negotiate the Constitution of the United States. 

Harriton High School was designed in 1957 by architect Vincent Kling based on principals popular in California and opened in 1958 featuring a campus-style school.  The Harriton High School designed by Kling consisted of five buildings connected by covered walkways otherwise open to the elements, a style unusual for the region (and that it shared with Welsh Valley Middle School, built at the same time). Kling intended to create a modern design that encompasses a simple and effective layout with a focus on natural light and an airy environment. Ironically, Harriton's 1958 campus buildings surrounded a mostly concrete courtyard and was nicknamed "the Tombs" (despite the natural light and air). 

As of the 2009 school year, a new three-story building replaced the now demolished 1958 Kling designed school to make room for greater need for more sports fields and academic facilities (such as classrooms).

Clubs and activities

Science Olympiad
Harriton hosts a successful Science Olympiad chapter. The Team has placed among the top 10 at the Science Olympiad National Tournament for 21 consecutive years, winning three national championships and 16 consecutive state championships in that span.

Harriton competes in the Southeastern Region for Regionals and Pennsylvania for States. Although they have not run any invitationals in the past, Harriton participates in multiple of invitationals, including Conestoga, Twin Tiers (Athens), Solon, Wright State, Massachusetts Institute of Technology (MIT), Cornell, Upenn and Princeton. In the states competition, Harriton held the longest winning streak out of any Pennsylvanian team, athletic or not—placing first place at States for sixteen consecutive years (1997 to 2013). At the National competition, the team won the national title in 1995, 2001 and 2005. Additionally, the team has competed in the national competition from 1994 to present, 22 years. In more recent years, Harriton has not performed as well in Science Olympiad. In the 2021 season, the team got second at states, losing to Lower Merion High School. The team then went on to place 16th at the national tournament, the first time since 1993 that the team did not place in the top 10 at nationals. The 2020 regional, state, and national competitions were cancelled due to the Covid-19 pandemic.

Academic Decathlon
Harriton High School features a chapter of the United States Academic Decathlon. The chapter participates in the Eastern Pennsylvania Regional Competition.

Music at Harriton
Harriton features a full concert band and orchestra. Harriton also features a performance jazz band. Every fall and spring, Harriton stages a music concert featuring all the ensembles, as well as an occasional string quartet and percussion ensemble. Neither high school in Lower Merion School District supports a marching band, but Harriton does have its own "RAM Band", which plays at home and away football games.

Every year Harriton musicians audition for positions in the PMEA district band and/or orchestra.

Harriton Banner
The school newspaper had been called the Harriton Forum or the Harriton Free Forum since the opening of Harriton High School in 1957. In October 2006, it was renamed the Harriton Banner.

Future Business Leaders of America (FBLA)
Harriton High School features a chapter of the Future Business Leaders of America. The chapter has been highly successful in the last few years. Members who advance past the PA Region 20 competition are eligible to compete in the annual State Leadership Conference (SLC) in Hershey, Pennsylvania. Members of FBLA chapters from across the State of Pennsylvania compete at the SLC for the right to compete in the  National Leadership Conference (NLC).

Technology Student Association (TSA)
Harriton TSA has had successes at regional, state, and national competitions, including a TSA national championship in Prepared Presentation in 2010. Harriton TSA members held five of the eight Pennsylvania TSA state officer positions. The four Lower Merion School District TSA chapters, including Harriton's TSA, consistently win more awards than any other school district in the Commonwealth of Pennsylvania. As TSA itself deals within the realm of STEM learning, it is often compared to the successful Science Olympiad team.

Harriton Student Council (HSC)

This is the main body of representation for the Harriton student body. HSC holds meetings that are open to any Harriton student. HSC recruits members, who vote on issues at the meetings. Members are divided into six committees: Students' Rights, Events, Communication, Finance, Planning, and Technology. There is a sub-committee under Students' Rights that was established after the district initiated the 1:1 laptop-to-student initiative (the Students' Rights Technology Sub-Committee).  Council is the organizing and executing body of the annual "Mr. Harriton" competition, one of the flagship productions at Harriton High School. Mr harriton is a competition between male students engaging in a "beauty pageant" style competition. It is generally a comedic event and it raises money for charity. The Student Council collects revenue from the show through ticket sales and catalog advertising. In 2014, the Student Council raised a record $17,000, all of which went to charity. In December 2018, the name of the event was changed to "Dr. Harriton" to reflect the fact that anyone may participate.

Athletics

Harriton High School competes the Central League in District 1 of the Pennsylvania Interscholastic Athletic Association (PIAA).

Tennis
Harriton's girls tennis team held the PIAA State Class AA Team Tennis Title for seven consecutive years from 2004 to 2010. After moving up to Class AAA in 2012, girls tennis won the PIAA State Class AAA Team Tennis Titles in 2016, 2017, and 2019.

Lacrosse
Harriton's girls lacrosse won the PIAA State Championship in 2013 and 2019.
Harriton's boys lacrosse won Pennsylvania State championships in 1970, 1971, and 1972 and came in second in 1974 and 1975.

Golf
Since 2013, Ram Golf has reached the PIAA District Team Championship competition in two of three years, as well as individuals reaching the district competition each year.

Cross Country/Track
Harriton has a cross country team in the fall, as well as a track team for the winter and the spring.

Ice hockey
Harriton features a Boys' Ice Hockey Team. It separated from the joint Lower Merion/Harriton team after the 2009–2010 season.

Crew
Harriton's rowing team has sent several boats to the National regatta. In the Spring of 2013, the Women's Varsity 4+ boat won the Scholastic National Championships, as well as made it to the final round of the Women's Henley Regatta in Henley-on-Thames, England. Both its girls' and boys' teams have won races in the all-city regatta. In 1976, Harriton's Varsity 4+ won the boys Stotesbury Regatta. In 1977, the boys Varsity 4+ won the Boys National Championship on Lake Carnegie in Princeton, NJ.

Football
Harriton's football team is ranked 486th in the state, and includes a varsity roster of 56 students.

Soccer
They offer both Girls and Boys Varsity Soccer during the fall season.

Swimming 
The Harriton High School swim includes a girls and boys Varsity and Junior Varsity teams. As of 2016, the boys teams have won 3 out of the last 5 state championships and the girls have won 2 out of the last 4. The team practices at Lower Merion High School.

Laptop privacy lawsuit

In the 2010 WebcamGate case, plaintiffs charged Harriton High School and Lower Merion High School with secretly spying on students by remotely activating webcams embedded in school-issued laptops the students were using at home, and therefore infringed on their privacy rights.  The schools admitted to secretly snapping over 66,000 webshots and screenshots, including webcam shots of students in their bedrooms.  In October 2010, the school district agreed to pay $610,000 to settle the Robbins and parallel Hasan lawsuits against it.

Notable alumni
Lynda Resnick (1960) – President/CEO Roll International Corporation.
Andy Hertzfeld (1971) – Personal computing pioneer, member of the original Apple Macintosh design team.
Susan Kare (1971) – Graphic designer and originator of icons and typefaces for Apple Computer.
Lawrence Summers (1972) – former president of Harvard University, former U. S. Secretary of the Treasury, and former director of the National Economic Council. (Summers returned to Harriton in 2009 to speak at the school's 50th commencement, and in 2015 to speak in the auditorium for the Stock Market Club.)
Arn Tellem (1972) – Sports agent named "One of the 50 Most Influential People in Sports Business".
David Crane (1975) – Emmy Award-winning TV writer/producer/director, creator of Friends.
Kenneth Merz (1977) – American biochemist and molecular biologist currently the Joseph Zichis Chair and a Distinguished University Professor at Michigan State University.
Adena Halpern (1987) – Author, The Ten Best Days of My Life (2008, Plume), 29 (2010, Touchstone), and Pinch Me (2011, Touchstone)
Josh Becker (politician) (1987) – California State Senator
John Wozniak (1988) – guitarist/singer Marcy Playground
Katie Wright (1990) – actress, Melrose Place married to actor/director Hank Azaria since 2007
Lou D'Angeli (1991) – performer & writer for Extreme Championship Wrestling and World Wrestling Entertainment & currently working for Cirque du Soleil in Las Vegas overseeing all marketing and PR.
Josh Cooke (1998) – actor, notably Dexter, I Love You Man, and Curb Your Enthusiasm
Wendell Holland (2002) - Winner of Survivor: Ghost Island and contestant on Survivor: Winners at War
Eugene Bright (2003) – American football player
Britt Reid (2003) - American football coach
Callahan Bright (2005) – American football player

References

External links

 Lower Merion School District
 Harriton High School

Public high schools in Pennsylvania
International Baccalaureate schools in Pennsylvania
Lower Merion Township, Pennsylvania
Educational institutions established in 1958
Schools in Montgomery County, Pennsylvania
1958 establishments in Pennsylvania
School buildings completed in 2009